The São Simão Dam is an embankment dam on the Paranaíba River near São Simão in Goiás/Minas Gerais, Brazil. It was constructed for hydroelectric power production and flood control. The dam was completed in 1978 and all generators were operational by 1979. In 1977, the first use of roller compacted concrete in Brazilian dam construction occurred on the São Simão.

Specifications

Reservoir

São Simão Hydroelectric Power Plant
There is additional room for four more generators in the power stations but there are no plans to have them installed currently.

See also

List of power stations in Brazil

References

Dams completed in 1978
Dams in Goiás
Embankment dams
Roller-compacted concrete dams
Dams in Minas Gerais